Pella is a census-designated place in the town of Pella, Shawano County, Wisconsin, United States. Its population was 185 as of the 2010 census. Pella is located along the Embarrass River.

Images

References

Census-designated places in Shawano County, Wisconsin
Census-designated places in Wisconsin